"N'oublie pas" is a song recorded in 2018 by Mylène Farmer in collaboration with American singer LP. The song reached number one on the French Singles Chart.

Charts

References

2018 singles
2018 songs
Mylène Farmer songs
French-language songs
SNEP Top Singles number-one singles
Songs written by Mylène Farmer
Songs written by Mike Del Rio
Songs written by LP (singer)
Songs written by Nate Campany